Amir Khamayuni Mokhammad (born 23 February 1996) is a Russian football player of Afghan descent. He plays for FC KAMAZ Naberezhnye Chelny.

Club career
He made his debut in the Russian Professional Football League for FC Legion Dynamo Makhachkala on 28 July 2016 in a game against FC SKA Rostov-on-Don.

On 25 July 2018, he signed with the Russian Premier League club FC Anzhi Makhachkala. He made his Russian Premier League debut for Anzhi on 28 July 2018 in a game against FC Ural Yekaterinburg.

In August 2020, Amir signed with FC Krasny for the 2020–21 season. On 20 September 2020, he has scored his debut goal for Krasny against Saturn Ramenskoye.

Personal life
He is the younger brother of Sharif Mukhammad, another Dagestani-born Afghan football player.

References

External links
 Profile by Russian Professional Football League

1996 births
Russian people of Afghan descent
Sportspeople from Makhachkala
Living people
Russian footballers
Association football midfielders
FC Anzhi Makhachkala players
FC Avangard Kursk players
FC KAMAZ Naberezhnye Chelny players
Russian Premier League players
Russian First League players
Russian Second League players